Costin Village is an abandoned townsite at the location of what is now the city of Mountain Iron, Minnesota.  Costin Village was founded by John Costin.  Its population in the year 1907 was 1,000 people.

References

"Minnesota Geographic Names: Their Origin and Historic Significance," Warren Upham, Minnesota Historical Society, 1920 
 

Former populated places in Minnesota
Former populated places in St. Louis County, Minnesota